Udon Thani Rajabhat University Stadium is a multi-purpose stadium in Udon Thani Province, Thailand. It is currently used mostly for football matches.

Multi-purpose stadiums in Thailand
Buildings and structures in Udon Thani province
Sport in Udon Thani province